"A dingo ate my baby!" is a cry popularly attributed to Lindy Chamberlain-Creighton, as part of the 1980 death of Azaria Chamberlain case, at Uluru in the Northern Territory, Australia. The Chamberlain family had been camping near the rock when their nine-week-old daughter was taken from their tent by a dingo. Prosecuting  authorities rejected her story about a dingo as far-fetched, charging her with murder and securing convictions against her and, also, against her then-husband Michael Chamberlain as an accessory after the fact. After years of challenge in the courts, both parents were absolved of the crime and a coroner found Azaria's death was the result of being eaten by a dingo.

In popular culture
The phrase was popularised via the case, but Chamberlain is reported to have either called out to her husband, "the dingo's got my baby," "a dingo took my baby!", "That dog's got my baby!" or "My God, My God, a dingo has got my baby!" In the 1988 film Evil Angels (also known as A Cry in the Dark), Chamberlain, as played by Meryl Streep, exclaims, "the dingo's got my baby!". In the 1991 Seinfeld episode "The Stranded", Elaine (Julia Louis-Dreyfus) uses the phrase "The dingo ate your baby" in a scene at a party.

In the 1994 movie The Adventures of Priscilla, Queen of the Desert, during a game a charades, a character depicts a famous woman, with a baby, and a canine with Lindy Chamberlain being the answer.

In the 1994 episode "Flour Child" from TV series Frasier, when Eddie is attacking the bag of flour, Daphne says in an Australian accent, "That dingo's got your baby."

In the 1997 TV series, Buffy the Vampire Slayer the character Oz belonged to a band called Dingoes Ate My Baby.

In the 2006 episode "Mother Tucker" from Family Guy, Stewie Griffin makes a reference to the phrase by stating "from the station that reaches the beaches, you're listening to dingo and the baby"

In the 2007 episode "Product Recall" from The Office, Kevin, when trying to speak with an Australian accent, makes a reference by stating "I like ice cream, too, mate. Alligators, and dingo babies."

References

Further reading
 The Story Behind "The Dingo Ate My Baby" (audio)

1980 in Australia
1980 neologisms
Quotations
Canines in popular culture